June 14 - Eastern Orthodox Church calendar - June 16

All fixed commemorations below celebrated on June 28 by Orthodox Churches on the Old Calendar.

For June 15th, Orthodox Churches on the Old Calendar commemorate the Saints listed on June 2.

Saints
 Prophet Amos (8th century BC)
 Apostles Fortunatus, Achaicus, and Stephanas, of the Seventy Apostles (1st century)
 Saint Cedronus (Kedron), Patriarch of Alexandria (107)
 Martyr Hesychius the Soldier, of Dorostolum, and two others, in Moesia (297)
 Martyrs Vitus, Modestus, and Crescentia, at Lucania (c. 303)
 Virgin-martyrs Libya and Leonides, sisters, and Eutropia, a girl of twelve years, at Palmyra, in Syria (304)
 Martyr Dulas of Cilicia (c. 305–313)
 Martyr Grace, by the sword.
 Martyr Nerses.
 Saint Ortisios (Orsiesius) of Tabennisi, disciple of St. Pachomius the Great (c. 308 or 380)
 Blessed Jerome (Hieronymus) of Stridonium (419-420)  (see also: September 30 - West)
 Saint Augustine, Bishop of Hippo (430), and his mother St. Monica of Tagaste (387)  (see also: August 28)
 Saint Dulas the Passion bearer, of Egypt (5th century)
 Saint Michael I of Kiev, first Metropolitan of Kiev (992)
 Venerable Joseph of Bethlehem, monk.

Pre-Schism Western saints
 Saint Abraham of Clermont, Abbot, of Auvergne in Gaul, Wonderworker (477)
 Saint Melanius II, Bishop of Viviers in France (c. 549)
 Saint Trillo of Llandrillo (Drillo, Drel), patron saint of two places in Gwynedd in Wales (6th century)
 Saint Vouga (Vougar, Veho, Feock, Fiech), a bishop from Ireland who settled in Brittany and lived there as a hermit near Lesneven (6th century)
 Saint Landelinus, former brigand who underwent a Christian conversion and became a monastic founder (c. 686)
 Saints Domitian and Hadelin (Adelinus), two disciples of St Landelinus at Lobbes in Belgium (c. 686)
 Saint Constantine, Bishop of Beauvais (706)
 Saint Benildis, martyr of Córdoba, Spain (853)
 Saint Edburgh of Winchester (Edburga), daughter of Edward the Elder and granddaughter of Alfred the Great (960)

Post-Schism Orthodox saints
 Venerable Sabbas the Fool-for-Christ, of Vatopedi monastery, Mount Athos (1350) (see also: October 5 )
 Saint Spyridon, Serbian Patriarch (1389)
 Great-martyr Tsar Lazar of Serbia (1389)
 Saint Ephraim, Serbian Patriarch (1400)
 Saint Symeon of Novgorod, Archbishop of Novgorod (1421)
 Saint Jonah of Moscow, Metropolitan and Wonderworker of Kiev, Moscow, and all Russia (1461)  (see also: March 31 )
 Saints Sergius and Barbara of Oyatsk, monastics, parents of St. Alexander of Svir (1477-1480)
 Monk-martyrs Gregory, Abbot, and Cassian, monk, of Avnezhk Monastery in Vologda, Wonderworkers (1524)

New martyrs and confessors
 New Hieromartyr Amos Ivanov, Priest (1918)

Other commemorations
 Translation of the relics (c. 9th century) of Saint Theodore the Sykeote, Bishop of Anastasiopolis (613)
 Synaxis of All New Martyrs of the Serbian Land ("Vidovdan").
 "Marianica" Icon of the Most Holy Theotokos.
 Repose of Elder Theophan of the Roslavl Forests and Optina (1819)
 Repose of Blessed Jonah, Fool-for-Christ, of Peshnosha Monastery (1838)
 Repose of Metropolitan Innocent of Peking (1931)
 Repose of Elder Cosmas of Valaam and Riga (1968)
 Repose of Elder Anthimus of St. Anne's Skete, Mount Athos (1996)

Icon gallery

Notes

References

Sources
 June 15/28. Orthodox Calendar (PRAVOSLAVIE.RU).
 June 28 / June 15. HOLY TRINITY RUSSIAN ORTHODOX CHURCH (A parish of the Patriarchate of Moscow).
 June 15. OCA - The Lives of the Saints.
 The Autonomous Orthodox Metropolia of Western Europe and the Americas (ROCOR). St. Hilarion Calendar of Saints for the year of our Lord 2004. St. Hilarion Press (Austin, TX). p. 44.
 The Fifteenth Day of the Month of June. Orthodoxy in China.
 June 15. Latin Saints of the Orthodox Patriarchate of Rome.
 The Roman Martyrology. Transl. by the Archbishop of Baltimore. Last Edition, According to the Copy Printed at Rome in 1914. Revised Edition, with the Imprimatur of His Eminence Cardinal Gibbons. Baltimore: John Murphy Company, 1916. pp. 173–174.
 Rev. Richard Stanton. A Menology of England and Wales, or, Brief Memorials of the Ancient British and English Saints Arranged According to the Calendar, Together with the Martyrs of the 16th and 17th Centuries. London: Burns & Oates, 1892. pp. 269–271.
Greek Sources
 Great Synaxaristes:  15 ΙΟΥΝΙΟΥ. ΜΕΓΑΣ ΣΥΝΑΞΑΡΙΣΤΗΣ.
  Συναξαριστής. 15 Ιουνίου. ECCLESIA.GR. (H ΕΚΚΛΗΣΙΑ ΤΗΣ ΕΛΛΑΔΟΣ). 
  15 Ιουνίου. Αποστολική Διακονία της Εκκλησίας της Ελλάδος (Apostoliki Diakonia of the Church of Greece).
  15/06/2017. Ορθόδοξος Συναξαριστής. 
Russian Sources
  28 июня (15 июня). Православная Энциклопедия под редакцией Патриарха Московского и всея Руси Кирилла (электронная версия). (Orthodox Encyclopedia - Pravenc.ru).
  15 июня по старому стилю / 28 июня по новому стилю. Русская Православная Церковь - Православный церковный календарь на 2017 год.
  15 июня (ст.ст.) 28 июня 2014 (нов. ст.). Русская Православная Церковь Отдел внешних церковных связей. (DECR).

June in the Eastern Orthodox calendar